D407 branches off to the southwest from D8 in Zadar towards Zadar ferry port - ferry access to Preko, Ugljan Island (D110), Brbinj and Sali, Dugi otok (D124), as well as Ancona, Italy.

The road, as well as all other state roads in Croatia, is managed and maintained by Hrvatske ceste, state owned company.

Traffic volume 

D407 traffic is not counted directly, however Hrvatske ceste, operator of the road reports number of vehicles using ferry service flying from Zadar port, accessed by the D407 road, thereby allowing the D407 traffic volume to be deduced. Substantial variations between annual (AADT) and summer (ASDT) traffic volumes are attributed to the fact that the road serves as a connection carrying substantial tourist traffic to Zadar area islands, while the D8 state road provides quick access to A1 motorway Zadar 1 and Zadar 2 interchanges, either directly, or via D424 state road.

Road junctions and populated areas

Sources

State roads in Croatia
Transport in Zadar County